Helena, Helen, Jelena or Ilona of Hungary may refer to:

 Helen of Hungary, Queen of Croatia (died c. 1091), daughter of King Béla I of Hungary and wife of King Demetrius Zvonimir of Croatia
 Helena of Serbia, Queen of Hungary (after 1109–after 1146), wife of King Béla II of Hungary
 Helena of Hungary, Duchess of Austria (c. 1158–1199), daughter of King Géza II of Hungary and wife of Leopold V, Duke of Austria